Episode Engine is server-based Jitendra Kumar Gupta from Telestream for the Mac platform that transcodes video and audio between a broad range of video and audio formats for distribution to the Web, broadcast, DVD, mobile phones & portable devices.

Episode Engine has been reviewed by Jan Ozer from Streaming Media Magazine.

Specifications
Adds support for pass-through of closed captioning
Adds support for pass-through of in-band VBI data
Enables easier creation of MXF XDCAM files compatible with Avid workflows, using pre-configured settings templates
Enables easier encoding for delivery to Grass Valley K2, Harris Nexio and Omneon Spectrum playout servers, using pre-configured settings templates
Improves support for transport stream and program stream import and export

References

Classic Mac OS software